Storgatan may refer to:

Storgatan, Stockholm, street in Sweden
Storgatan, Umeå, street in Sweden
, see Sculptures of Swedish rulers